Cretin-Derham Hall High School (CDH) is a private, co-educational Catholic high school in Saint Paul, Minnesota operated by the Archdiocese of Saint Paul and Minneapolis. It is co-sponsored by the Brothers of the Christian Schools and the Sisters of St. Joseph of Carondelet.

Cretin High School was named for Joseph Crétin, the first Catholic bishop of Saint Paul, while Derham Hall High School was named for Hugh Derham, a Minnesotan farmer who donated money to start an all-female Catholic boarding school.

History

The present-day Cretin-Derham Hall is the result of a merger between Cretin High School and Derham Hall in 1987. Cretin was founded  in 1871 as a secondary school for boys by the Christian Brothers.  In the late 1800s, the school incorporated a mandatory program of instruction grounded in the tradition of a military institute, which makes it one of the oldest such programs in the United States.  Instruction included lessons in leadership, close-order drill and ceremonies, and numerous other strictly non-combat-related instruction designed to instill a sense of discipline and order in all aspects of student life.  The National Defense Act of 1916 created the Reserve Officers' Training Corps (ROTC), a more formalized program of instruction with national oversight for training standards and a provision for active duty and retired soldiers and officers as instructors. Cretin's "military program" became one of the first Junior ROTC (JROTC) programs in the country, and participation remained mandatory for all students until the early 1980s, when it became voluntary.

Derham Hall was established by the Sisters of St. Joseph of Carondelet in 1905 as a college preparatory school for girls and was originally located on the campus of St. Catherine University (then the College of St. Catherine) in the original building, Derham Hall. In 1987, the two merged to become Cretin-Derham Hall, a co-educational institution. The original building on the St. Catherine campus is listed on the National Register of Historic Places.

Athletics
Cretin-Derham Hall is part of the Suburban East Conference in the Minnesota State High School League. Prior to joining the Suburban East Conference, Cretin-Derham Hall played in the Saint Paul City Conference for twenty six years. The Raiders won their tenth state championship in football in 2009 with a 16–5 win over Eden Prairie in the title game. The Raiders most recently captured its third state championship in 2018 with 79–78 win over Apple Valley when Daniel Oturu scored the game-winner on an alley-oop dunk with .5 seconds remaining that was nationally recognized on ESPN.

State championships

Theater

Cretin-Derham Hall additionally has a theater program both in terms of co-curricular and extracurricular opportunities. The Cretin-Derham Hall theater department has achieved first place in the Minnesota State High School League One Act Competition although the school no longer participates.

In the summer of 2005 the theater department was one of about 20 schools invited to perform at the Edinburgh Festival Fringe in Edinburgh, Scotland. This invitation was "based on their most recent bodies of work, awards, community involvement, philosophies, and recommendations."

The spring musical of 2009, Crazy for You, won an Outstanding awards for Overall Production of a Musical, Performance by a Chorus Ensemble, Performance by a Dance Ensemble, and two for Performances in a Leading Role from Spotlight Musical Theatre Awards.   In addition, three Honorable Mentions were given to Performance in a Lead Role, Performance in a Supporting Role, and Performance in a Featured Role.

Notable alumni

Cretin High School, Derham Hall, and Cretin-Derham Hall High School have been attended by several persons of note in its history, including:
John Albers - former chairman, CEO and president of Dr Pepper/Seven-Up Companies
Brandon Archer - former NFL linebacker, played at Kansas State University
Matt Birk - former center, Minnesota Vikings and Baltimore Ravens
James Byrne - Auxiliary Bishop of Saint Paul (1947–1956), Bishop of Boise (1956–1962), Archbishop of Dubuque (1962-1983)
Thomas R. Byrne - mayor of Saint Paul (1966-1970)
Archbishop Robert Carlson - ninth Archbishop of St. Louis
Chris Coleman - mayor of Saint Paul (2006–2018)
Jashon Cornell - Defensive End for the Detroit Lions, played at Ohio State University.
Ian Anthony Dale - actor
John Michael Drexler - businessman and Minnesota state legislator
James E. Duffy Jr. - Justice on the Hawaii Supreme Court (term 2003-2013)
Jake Esch - baseball player
Michael Floyd - NFL wide receiver, Free Agent, graduate of Notre Dame
Jack Hannahan - baseball player, drafted third round (87th overall) by Detroit Tigers in 2001
Ryan Harris - former NFL offensive lineman, Pittsburgh Steelers, 2015 Super Bowl Champion, former Notre Dame player
Josh Hartnett - actor (graduated from South High School in Minneapolis, Minnesota)
Seantrel Henderson - NFL offensive lineman, Buffalo Bills, former University of Miami player
David Housewright - author, former President of the Private Eye Writers of America
Jerome M. Hughes - Minnesota state senator, educator
Walt Kiesling – Hall of Fame football lineman
Corbin Lacina - former NFL player
Joe Mauer - former first baseman and catcher, Minnesota Twins, 2009 American League MVP
Carl McCullough - former running back at University of Wisconsin and in NFL Europe
Ryan McDonagh - NHL defenseman, 2020 Stanley Cup Champion, Tampa Bay Lightning
James Miller, missionary (teacher)
Kate Millett - author (Sexual Politics)
Paul Moga - Brigadier General in the United States Air Force, current Commandant of Cadets of the United States Air Force Academy, former F-22A Raptor demonstration pilot, and former Television show host. 
Paul Molitor - former manager of Minnesota Twins and Baseball Hall of Famer
George "Bugs" Moran - Prohibition-era gangster in Chicago; birth name was Adelard Cunin
James Onwualu - NFL player
Daniel Oturu - NBA player -Los Angeles Clippers, Memphis Grizzlies, Toronto Raptors, Chicago Bulls
Robert W. Reif - Minnesota state legislator and physician
Fr. John A. Ryan (1887) - economist, theologian, and theorist of early 20th Century
Thomas A. Schwartz - retired Army four-star general who commanded U.S. Forces Command from 1998–99 and Forces Korea 1999-2002
Chris Staples - Production Supervisor, MGK
Heidemarie Martha Stefanyshyn-Piper - astronaut, assisted in initial reassembly of International Space station with NASA
Tim Tschida - umpire, Major League Baseball
John Vachon - photographer for FSA (Farm Security Administration), Life magazine, and Look magazine
Joseph Votel - General, commander of Joint Special Operations
Steve Walsh - former NFL quarterback, led Miami Hurricanes to NCAA national championship and uncle to another Cretin-Derham Hall High School alumni Ryan McDonagh
Mark Wegner - umpire, Major League Baseball
Chris Weinke - quarterback, 2000 Heisman Trophy winner, assistant coach for Los Angeles Rams and University of Alabama

Notes

References

External links

Roman Catholic Archdiocese of Saint Paul and Minneapolis
High schools in Saint Paul, Minnesota
Lasallian schools in the United States
Catholic secondary schools in Minnesota
Educational institutions established in 1871
1871 establishments in Minnesota
Sisters of Saint Joseph schools